Martin Tupper, FRS, FGS (1780 – 8 December 1844) of 5 New Burlington Street, London was an English physician.

The son of John Tupper and Catherine Bowden, he became a respected physician whose patients included the Duke of Wellington.

As well as becoming a Fellow of the Medical and Chirurgical Society of London in 1819 he was an amateur geologist and a Fellow of the Geological Society. He was also elected a Fellow of the Royal Society in February 1835.

Tupper married Ellin Marris, and had four sons, including the poet Martin Farquhar Tupper.

He died in 1844 at South Hill Park, the Berkshire home of the dying Edmund Pery, 1st Earl of Limerick, while attending him in a medical capacity.

References

1780 births
1844 deaths
19th-century English medical doctors
Fellows of the Geological Society of London
Fellows of the Royal Society